Rosamond Gilder (born Janet Rosamond de Kay Gilder, 1891 - September, 1986) was an American theater critic.

Life 
Gilder was a native of Marion, Massachusetts, daughter of writer Richard Watson Gilder. She was raised in New York City in artistic surroundings, and met such figures as Mark Twain, Jacob Riis, and Eleonora Duse. She began contributing articles to Theatre Arts Monthly during the 1920s, and joined its staff in 1936. Ten years later she succeeded Edith Isaacs in its editorship. In 1947 she was one of the founders of the International Theater Institute, in which role she promoted the idea of sending American theater companies to tour abroad. She was elected president of its American arm in 1963, remaining in the post until 1969. She spearheaded the production of numerous theatrical publications, and published articles and books on dramatic subjects as well.

Gilder received a Tony Award in 1948 and a Guggenheim Fellowship in 1950. In 1964 she was enrolled in the French Ordre des Arts et des Lettres. A selection of her papers are held at the New York Public Library.

References

External links
 Rosamond Gilder papers, 1917-1949, held by the Billy Rose Theatre Division, New York Public Library for the Performing Arts

1891 births
1986 deaths
American women journalists
American theater critics
American women critics
20th-century American journalists
20th-century American women writers
People from Marion, Massachusetts
Journalists from Massachusetts
Journalists from New York City
Tony Award winners
Recipients of the Ordre des Arts et des Lettres